103.7 Lite FM may refer to:

 KVIL, a radio station (103.7 FM) licensed to Highland Park, Texas, United States
 WLTC, a radio station (103.7 FM) licensed to Cusseta, Georgia, United States